South American native ungulates, commonly abbreviated as SANUs, are extinct ungulate-like mammals of controversial affinities that were indigenous to South America prior to the Great American Biotic Interchange. They comprise five major groups conventionally ranked as orders—Astrapotheria, Litopterna, Notoungulata, Pyrotheria, and Xenungulata—as well as the primitive "condylarth" groups Didolodontidae and Kollpaniinae. It has been proposed that some or all of the members of this group form a clade, named Meridiungulata, though the relationships of South American ungulates remain largely unresolved. The two largest groups of South American ungulates, the notoungulates and the litopterns, were the only groups to persist beyond the mid Miocene. Only a few of the largest species of notoungulates and litopterns survived until the end-Pleistocene extinctions.

Though most SANUs lived in South America, astrapotheres and litopterns are known from Eocene aged deposits in the Antarctic Peninsula. and the notoungulate Mixotoxodon spread as far north as what is now Texas during the Great American Biotic Interchange.

Taxonomy
Meridiungulata might have originated in South America from a North American condylarth ancestor, and they may be members of the clade Laurasiatheria, related to other ungulates, including artiodactyls and perissodactyls. It has, however, been suggested the Meridiungulata are part of a different macro-group of placental mammals called Atlantogenata.

Much of the evolution of meridiungulates occurred in isolation from other ungulates, a great example of convergent evolution. However, the argument that meridiungulates are related to artiodactyls and perissodactyls needs support from molecular sequencing. Some paleontologists have also challenged the monophyly of Meridiungulata by suggesting that the pyrotheres are more closely related to other mammals, such as Embrithopoda (an African order possibly related to elephants), than to other South American ungulates.

Molecular sequence data from both collagen and mitochondrial DNA supports a placement of litopterns within the total group of Perissodactyla, Panperissodactyla, which has also been supported by some analyses of morphology. However, other morphological analyses have placed Litopterna elsewhere within Laurasiatheria. Didolodontids may be closely related to litopterns, and it has been proposed that they should be classified within Litopterna, but some analyses do not find them to be close relatives.

Molecular sequence data from collagen supports a close relationship between Notoungulata and Litopterna within Panperissodactyla, suggesting that at least part of Meridiungulata is monophyletic. By contrast, morphology-based analyses have found a range of possible positions for notoungulates. They have been found to be elsewhere within Laurasiatheria, within Afrotheria, and as stem-group atlantogenatans. A position within Afrotheria has been argued to be unlikely on biogeographic grounds, and some of the afrotherian characteristics present in notoungulates have been refuted.

Litopterns and notoungulates are the only South American ungulates to have gone extinct recently enough for molecular data to be available, so the relationships of astrapotheres, pyrotheres, and xenungulates must be determined based on morphology alone.

The clade Sudamericungulata has been proposed to encompass astrapotheres, notoungulates, pyrotheres, and xenoungulates but not litopterns. Such a clade had been found in previous studies, but left unnamed. The study proposing the name Sudamericungulata found them to be afrotheres.

Notes

References 

 
 
 
 
 
 
 
 
 
 
 

 
 
 
 
 
 

 
Cenozoic mammals of South America

Mammal unranked clades
Prehistoric mammals of South America
Ungulates
Taxa named by Malcolm McKenna